Britt Arenander (born 1941) is a Swedish translator, writer and journalist.

Life 
She was born in Stockholm and was educated at Södra Flickläroverket. She trained as a journalist during the 1960s. Arenander published a series of novels Steget in 1968, Off in 1969 and Alla broar brända in 1971. In 1974, she published her first collection of poetry Dröm om verkligheten utanför Stockholm och andra dikter. She has also written radio plays. During the 1990s, she worked as a translator of French and English literature into Swedish, including much of Anais Nin's diaries. She has also contributed to various anthologies including Liv och kärlek: om kvinnor av kvinnor and Anais Nin: A Book of Mirrors.

She served as press officer for the Secretariat of the Swedish branch of Amnesty International. She was also international secretary for the Swedish PEN club.

Arenander married Gustav Wiklund in 1964. The couple separated in 1973.

Selected works 
 Affären som inte fanns Stockholm: Alba, 1982,  
 Lorenzas dagbok Stockholm: Alba, 1990, 
 Anaïs Nins förlorede värld Stockholm: Trevi, 1995, 
  Anais Nin's Lost World Gaithersburg, MD : Sky Blue Press, 2017,

References 

1941 births
Living people
Swedish translators
Swedish women novelists
Swedish women poets
Swedish journalists